Nocardia alni is a species of bacteria from the genus Nocardia that has been isolated from the root nodules of Alnus glutinosa.

References

Mycobacteriales
Bacteria described in 2022